The 1885 population census in Bosnia and Herzegovina was the second census of the population of Bosnia and Herzegovina taken during the Austro-Hungarian occupation.

Results 
The number of inhabitants: 1,336,091
Population density: 26.1 /km²

Overall

References 

Censuses in Bosnia and Herzegovina
1885 in Austria-Hungary
Austro-Hungarian rule in Bosnia and Herzegovina
Bosnia